is a Japanese judoka. He is four times Asian champion and also won All-Japan Judo Championships in 1994 and 1997.

Career 
He is from Saitama Prefecture and began judo at the age of a seventh grader. After graduation from Nihon University, He belonged to Sohgo Security Services. He was long time before retiring itself from the high school days, a rival of Naoya Ogawa.

Konno also well known that he and Hidehiko Yoshida quarrelled at the final of All-Japan Championships in 1994, for Konno's dangerous skills like Kanibasami and Joint lock (Movie).

As of 2010, Konno coaches judo at his alma mater, Nihon University.

Achievements
1986 - World Junior Championships (+95 kg) 2nd
 - All-Japan Junior Championships (+95 kg) 2nd
 - All-Japan University Championships (+95 kg) 2nd
1987 - All-Japan University Championships (+95 kg) 2nd
1989 - Pacific Rim Championships (+95 kg) 1st
1990 - Jigoro Kano Cup (Openweight) 2nd
 - All-Japan Championships (Openweight only) 3rd
 - All-Japan Selected Championships (+95 kg) 3rd
1991 - Asian Championships (Openweight) 1st
 - All-Japan Championships (Openweight only) 2nd
 - All-Japan Selected Championships (+95 kg) 3rd
1993 - Asian Championships (Openweight) 1st
 - All-Japan Championships (Openweight only) 2nd
 - All-Japan Selected Championships (+95 kg) 3rd
1994 - Asian Games (+95 kg) 1st
 - All-Japan Championships (Openweight only) 1st
1995 - Kodokan Cup (+95 kg) 2nd
1996 - All-Japan Championships (Openweight only) 5th
1997 - Asian Championships (+95 kg) 1st
 - All-Japan Championships (Openweight only) 1st
1998 - All-Japan Championships (Openweight only) 5th
 - Kodokan Cup (+100 kg) 1st
1999 - Jigoro Kano Cup (+100 kg) 7th
 - All-Japan Championships (Openweight only) Loss
2000 - All-Japan Selected Championships (+100 kg) 3rd

References

Japanese male judoka
Sportspeople from Saitama Prefecture
1967 births
Living people
Nihon University alumni
Asian Games medalists in judo
Judoka at the 1994 Asian Games
Asian Games gold medalists for Japan
Medalists at the 1994 Asian Games
20th-century Japanese people